Dave Nestelle is a comic book colorist and creator who is known for his Star Wars: X-wing Rogue Squadron (comics).

Bibliography 
 
Star Wars: X-wing Rogue Squadron
Star Wars Tales
Dark Horse Presents
Star Wars
Barb Wire Movie Special
Dark Horse Monsters
Agents of Law

References 

Living people
Comics colorists
Year of birth missing (living people)